The Institute for the Struggle against the Dangers of Tobacco was set up at the University of Jena in 1942. It was one of the first scientific institutes to discover the dangers of smoking tobacco, including the link between smoking and lung cancer. However, due to its relationship with the ruling Nazi regime (it was supported in part by Adolf Hitler's funds), its work was not taken seriously after the Second World War.

References

See also 
Anti-tobacco movement in Nazi Germany

Health effects of tobacco
Scientific organizations established in the 1940s
Medical research institutes in Germany